This is a list of ambassadors of Iran to the United States.

On April 7, 1980, the Iran embassy closed in the United States due to severed diplomatic relations. Iran currently has no ambassador to the United States but simply a chief of the Interests Section of the Islamic Republic of Iran in the United States at the Pakistani Embassy.

See also
List of current Iranian ambassadors
Iran–United States relations

References

External links 
 Pictures of the former Embassy of Iran in Washington, D. C.

 
Iran
United States